Lynel Darcy Kitambala (born 26 October 1988) is a French footballer of Congolese descent who currently plays as a winger for French club JS Saint-Pierroise.

Career
Kitambala was born in Creil, France.

After playing for four other youth clubs in France, Kitambala finished his formation with Auxerre. After he was named on the bench for Auxerre's six games during 2007–08 season, he made his first team debut in a 0–0 home draw against Valenciennes on 1 November 2008, coming on as a substitute for Dennis Oliech.

In July 2009, Kitambala joined Ligue 2 club Dijon on a season-long loan deal.

On 20 August 2010, Kitambala signed a contract with Lorient, for an undisclosed fee thought to be in the region of €1.5 million. He made his debut at Stade du Moustoir on 28 August, and scored the second goal in a 2–0 win over Lyon. On 25 September, Kitambala scored a goal in the 89th minute against Monaco, securing a 2–1 victory for Lorient. He ended the season with 8 goals in all competitions.

On 31 August 2011, Kitambala signed with Saint-Étienne for a reported fee of €2.5 million. He made his debut for the club on 10 September, in a 3–1 home loss against Lille, coming on as an 85th-minute substitute for Laurent Batlles. He made only nine league starts throughout the season, in contrast to 24 starts he made in the previous season while at Lorient. In an attempt to earn some playing time, Kitambala spent the 2012–13 season on loan in the German 2. Bundesliga, where he played for Dynamo Dresden.

On 14 September 2015, Kitambala signed a two-year contract with Bulgarian side Levski Sofia.

In February 2019, he moved to Farense.

Career statistics

References

External links
 
 
 
 
 

Living people
1988 births
People from Creil
Sportspeople from Oise
French footballers
French expatriate footballers
France youth international footballers
Ligue 1 players
Ligue 2 players
Championnat National 2 players
Championnat National 3 players
First Professional Football League (Bulgaria) players
Challenger Pro League players
Slovak Super Liga players
Liga Portugal 2 players
2. Bundesliga players
AJ Auxerre players
Dijon FCO players
FC Lorient players
AS Saint-Étienne players
Dynamo Dresden players
PFC Levski Sofia players
Royale Union Saint-Gilloise players
Apollon Smyrnis F.C. players
FK Senica players
S.C. Farense players
French sportspeople of Democratic Republic of the Congo descent
Association football forwards
Expatriate footballers in Germany
Expatriate footballers in Belgium
Expatriate footballers in Bulgaria
Expatriate footballers in Slovakia
Expatriate footballers in Portugal
French expatriate sportspeople in Germany
French expatriate sportspeople in Belgium
French expatriate sportspeople in Bulgaria
French expatriate sportspeople in Slovakia
French expatriate sportspeople in Portugal
Black French sportspeople
Footballers from Hauts-de-France